Mount Arkanu or Jabal Arkanu (also Jebel Arkenu or Gebel Árchenu) is a mountain in Libya.

Geography
The mountain is located in the Libyan Desert in the Kufra District of Libya, about 300 km southeast of El Tag. and about 70 km west of Arkanu and the two Arkenu structures. 

Arkanu's existence has been known since 1892 through Arab sources. Arkanu was first discovered in 1923 by Ahmed Hassanein. The mountain consists of intrusive granite. The valley is 15 km long and oriented east-west. The valley has a green environment consisting of bushes, grass and some trees. 

Arkanu is used as a pasture. Each year the Bedouins bring their herds to the valley, leave them there and block the entrance (located at a height of ) with rocks. They return three months later to retrieve their cattle.

Sources

Notes

External links
 Jabal Arkanu
 Jabal Arkanu on Peakbagger

Cyrenaica
Arkanu